Reg Krezanski (born January 1, 1948 in New Westminster, British Columbia) is a retired World Hockey Association player. He played 2 games for the San Diego Mariners in the 1974–75 season.

External links
 

1948 births
Canadian ice hockey defencemen
Ice hockey people from British Columbia
Living people
North American Hockey League (1973–1977) coaches
Rochester Americans players
San Diego Mariners (PHL) players
San Diego Mariners players
Sportspeople from New Westminster
20th-century Canadian people